As of January 10, 2023, 49 women have served or are serving as the governor of a U.S. state (2 acting governors due to vacancies) and 3 women have served or are serving as the governor of a unincorporated U.S. territory. 2 women have served or are serving as Mayor of the District of Columbia. Currently, 12 women are serving as governors of U.S. states, along with the Mayor of the District of Columbia Muriel Bowser and territorial governor Lou Leon Guerrero of Guam.

Madeleine Kunin is the oldest living former female governor at 89.

History
The first woman to act as governor was Carolyn B. Shelton, who served as Acting Governor of Oregon for one weekend – 9 a.m. Saturday, February 27, through 10 a.m. Monday, March 1, 1909. The outgoing governor, George Earle Chamberlain, had been elected to the U.S. Senate and had to leave for Washington, D.C., before his term was over; the incoming governor, Frank W. Benson, had gotten sick and could not assume office early. Chamberlain left Shelton, his secretary, in charge for the weekend. It was another three and a half years before women were allowed to vote in Oregon.

The first woman to be acting governor to be entrusted with substantial duties while in office was Soledad Chávez de Chacón, who held the powers and duties of Governor of New Mexico for two weeks in 1924 while Governor James F. Hinkle attended the Democratic Convention in New York. Lieutenant Governor José A. Baca had died in May, so Chacón, the Secretary of State, filled the position. Chacón said that she believed that her 1924 elevation was the first time in the United States that a woman had been called on to assume the responsibilities of the governor.

The first woman to assume office as governor pursuant to a special election was Nellie Tayloe Ross of Wyoming (widow of late Governor William B. Ross, served from January 1923 to October 1924), who was elected on November 4, 1924, and sworn in on January 5, 1925. Wyoming was the first state to provide women's suffrage after New Jersey had abolished it in 1807. Elected on November 3, 1924, general election, and sworn in on January 20, 1925, was Miriam A. Ferguson of Texas, whose husband, Governor James Edward Ferguson, had previously held the office but been impeached and removed from office in 1917. The first woman elected governor without being the wife or widow of a past state governor was Ella T. Grasso of Connecticut, elected in 1974 and sworn in on January 8, 1975.

To date, no woman has ever changed parties during her gubernatorial term or has been elected as a third party member or an independent.

Demographics
Alabama, Arizona, Connecticut, and New Mexico are the only states to have elected women as governors from both major parties. Arizona was the first state where a woman followed another woman as governor (they were from different parties). Arizona also has had the most of 5, and is the first state to have 3 women in a row serve as governor.

A record 12 out of 50 state governorships have been held by women since Sarah Huckabee Sanders was inaugurated as Governor of Arkansas on January 10, 2023.

As of January 10, 2023, 18 states have never had a female governor: California, Colorado, Florida, Georgia, Idaho, Illinois, Indiana, Maryland, Minnesota, Mississippi, Missouri, Nevada, North Dakota, Pennsylvania, Tennessee, Virginia, West Virginia and Wisconsin. 4 states (Minnesota, Mississippi, Tennessee, and Utah) have never seen a major party nominate a woman in a gubernatorial election, although one woman has served as governor of Utah and 9 consecutive lieutenant governors have been women in Minnesota, from 1983 to the present day.

3 women of color have been state governors: Susana Martinez and Michelle Lujan Grisham of New Mexico (both Hispanic) and Nikki Haley of South Carolina (Asian American). Martinez and Haley are both Republican; Lujan Grisham is a Democrat. Additionally, all 5 women who governed an insular area have been of an ethnic minority group: Sharon Pratt and Muriel Bowser of Washington, D.C. (both African American), Sila María Calderón and Wanda Vázquez Garced of Puerto Rico (both Hispanic) and Lou Leon Guerrero of Guam (Pacific Islander), all Democratic, with the exception of Vázquez Garced, who is a Republican.

Histograph

State governors

Number of female governors by party

Number of female governors per state

Pregnancy

Territories and the District of Columbia

Number by party

Timeline of women serving as governors

Elections with two female major party nominees
Incumbent governors are in bold.

See also
List of first gentlemen in the United States
List of female lieutenant governors in the United States

Notes

References

External links
"History of Women Governors" Center for American Women and Politics, Eagleton Institute of Politics, Rutgers, The State University of New Jersey

Articles which contain graphical timelines
Governour
 Female

United States
United States